David "Little Tyson" Tetteh (born 5 July 1971 in Accra) is a Ghanaian professional light/light welter/welterweight boxer of the 1990s and 2000s who won the Ghanaian lightweight title, African Boxing Union lightweight title, and Commonwealth lightweight title, and was a challenger for the World Boxing Organization (WBO) North American Boxing Organization (NABO) lightweight title against Harold Warren, his professional fighting weight varied from , i.e. lightweight to , i.e. welterweight.

Professional boxing record

References

External links

1971 births
Lightweight boxers
Light-welterweight boxers
Living people
Boxers from Accra
Welterweight boxers
Ghanaian male boxers
African Boxing Union champions